Electric Lady is an album by Elkie Brooks.

Recorded between 2004 and 2005 at Slave to the Rhythm Studios, it was released on CD in 2005 by Swing Cafe. Little to no promotion and a small distribution meant that the album failed to enter the charts, though it made an impact on the UK independent album charts.

Track listing 
"Electric Lady" (Elkie Brooks, Jermaine Jordan) – 3:59
"So Good Looking" (Brooks, Jordan) – 3:28
"Try Harder" (Brooks, Jordan) – 3:29
"Roadhouse Blues" (Morrison, Densmore, Manzarek, Kreiger) – 4:59
"White Girl Lost in the Blues" (Brooks, Jordan) – 4:08
"The Groom's Still Waiting at the Altar (Bob Dylan) – 4:24
"Back Away" (Brooks, Jordan) – 3:48
"Muddy Water Blues" (Paul Rodgers) – 4:30
"The Brighter Side" (Brooks, Jordan) – 3:58
"Out of the Rain" (Tony Joe White) – 4:18
"Trailer Trash" (Brooks, Jordan) – 3:42

The album was re-released in January 2021 by Backline Studios and contained 5 unreleased bonus tracks:

Don't Change Horses (In The Middle of the Stream) 
Hard City 
Rocky Road 
The Roamer 
Don't Put Your Hand in the Cookie Jar

Personnel 
Elkie Brooks – vocals
Alan Welch – piano, keyboards
Geoff Whitehorn – guitar
Jermaine Jordan – guitar, bass guitar, drums, production
Steve Jones – saxophone
Lee Noble – backing vocals
Trevor Jordan – engineer

2005 albums
Elkie Brooks albums